Maria Bruntseva (born 12 June 1980) is a volleyball player from Russia, who played in several positions. She was a member of the Women's National Team that won the gold medal at the 2006 FIVB Women's World Championship.

References
 FIVB profile

1980 births
Living people
Russian women's volleyball players
Place of birth missing (living people)
Sportspeople from Irkutsk
20th-century Russian women
21st-century Russian women